Angela Maria of the Heart of Jesus, also called Angela Maria Autsch, baptized as Maria Cecilia Autsch (26 March 1900 – 23 December 1944), was a German Trinitarian Sister of Valencia, and Roman Catholic Venerable.

Early life 
Maria Cecilia Autsch was born in Röllecken, part of Attendorn in the Olpe district of (Westphalia), German Empire on 26 March 1900. She was a member of a modest working-class family (her father was a quarry worker) that regularly practised the Catholic faith. She went to school in the village of Bamenohl. The terrible economic situation in the Weimar Republic meant that she had to go out to work in the clothing store Bischoff & Broegger in Finnentrop, where she was popular amongst both fellow workers and customers

Maria was thirty-three years old when she joined the Trinitarian Sisters of Valence in Mötz, Austria. She began the novitiate and was given the name Angela Maria of the Sacred Heart of Jesus. The novitiate ended with the first profession of vows on 16 August 1934. Her final profession took place on 28 September 1938, the year Hitler annexed Austria.

Imprisonment 

When the Nazi party tried to expropriate the Mötzer monastery, Angela Autsch succeeded to save it by arguing that the Tyrolean monastery was Spanish property.

On the morning of 10 August 1940, Sr Angela went to buy some milk. She happened to meet some women she knew at the dairy and, conversing with them, she related that  the Allies had sunk a German ship off Norway and many had died in that disaster. She ended saying Hitler is a calamity for Europe. One of the women, a known Nazi sympathizer, related to her son, also a Nazi sympathizer, what she had heard from Sr. Angela. He reported the fact to the chief of the Gestapo.

The Gestapo opened a file on Sr. Angela and arrested her on 12 August 1940. She was jailed for seventeen days in Innsbruck before becoming prisoner no. 4651 in the concentration camp of Ravensbrück on 31 August 1940. There she was a light of hope and courage to her fellow inmates. She was frequently beaten by her captors but her contagious good humor was "a ray of sunshine in deepest Hell". Some prisoners who might have killed themselves were inspired by her, they said afterwards, even those who had no idea that she was a nun.

The Nazis sent Sr. Angela to Auschwitz concentration camp where she befriended a Jewish woman doctor from Slovakia, Margarita Schwalbova. Feeling depressed and less than human, she was deeply moved when the nun went up to her and gently stroked her hair. Although Schwalbova was an atheist, she and Sister Angela became friends, with the latter acting in a way that earned her the title Angel of Auschwitz. When Schwalbova was sick, she told her stories about the lives and miracles of the saints, shared her meager rations with her and others even though this was strictly forbidden. In March 1943, Sister Angela was transferred to Birkenau another camp where she worked in the kitchen and infirmary, caring equally for inmates and persecutors. She died of a heart attack on 23 December 1944, during an Allied air raid, just a month before the Allies liberated the camp.

Beatification process
Her cause for beatification was introduced by the Conference of Austrian Bishops on 26 March 1992. She was declared venerable by Pope Francis on 19 May 2018, upon the confirmation of her heroic virtue practiced during her life.

References

Further reading 
Ekkart Sauser: Autsch, Angela. In: Biographisch-Bibliographisches Kirchenlexikon (BBKL). Band 14, Bautz, Herzberg 1998, Sp. 730.

Trinitarians
1900 births
1944 deaths
20th-century German Roman Catholic nuns
German people who died in Auschwitz concentration camp
Venerated Catholics by Pope Francis
German civilians killed in World War II
Deaths by airstrike during World War II